Jules Gersie (13 October 1917 – 23 September 2005) was a Surinamese football manager, who managed S.V. Robinhood in the Surinamese Hoofdklasse from 1952 to 1957.

Career 
Born 13 October 1917 Paramaribo, Surinam, Gersie managed S.V. Robinhood in the Hoofdklasse starting in 1952, finishing as runner-up to S.V. Transvaal after the clubs' first season at the top flight. The following season saw Robinhood join Transvaal as tenants of the newly built National Stadium, where Gersie won his first national championship with Robinhood. He went on to win three more titles before ceding the managerial position to Humphrey Mac Nac.

Honours

Manager
S.V. Robinhood
 Hoofdklasse (4): 1953, 1954, 1955, 1956

References 

1917 births
2005 deaths
Sportspeople from Paramaribo
Surinamese football managers
S.V. Robinhood managers
SVB Eerste Divisie managers